Till We Meet Again is a 1988 novel by Judith Krantz.  

It was also made into a 1989 television mini-series, Judith Krantz's Till We Meet Again starring Bruce Boxleitner, Hugh Grant, Courteney Cox, Michael York, Lucy Gutteridge, Charles Shaughnessy, Mia Sara, and Barry Bostwick.

References

1988 American novels
American novels adapted into films
Novels by Judith Krantz
American romance novels